Scared Straight is an album by the American band New Bomb Turks, released in 1996. It was the band's first album to be released in Canada. New Bomb Turks promoted the album with a North American tour.

Production
Produced by the band, the album was recorded at 609 Recording, in Cleveland; New Bomb Turks had more time to spend in the studio. The band added keyboards, piano, and horns to some of the album's tracks. The lyrics were written by singer Eric Davidson, who took care to contrast the raucous music with reflective or ironic lines.

Critical reception

Entertainment Weekly wrote that "the New Bomb Turks really are special—and smart enough to know that throwing a bit of Stonesy raunch into their post-hardcore mix on Scared Straight is no crime." The Austin Chronicle concluded that "though all [their songs] boil with ripened punk-rock pugnaciousness, the ones that really get you going are the ones that make fists clench and pulses race." The Chicago Tribune called the album "pure, breakneck rock 'n' roll."

The Cleveland Scene determined that Scared Straight "comes off like Rocket From the Crypt backing Iggy Pop—horns and organ temper the rugged guitar workouts with distorted doses of rock and roll soul." The Austin American-Statesman note that "the New Bomb Turks are obviously into the 1960s-biker-clamdiggers-dancing-on-tabletops-boys-with-big-greasy-hair thing, but they do it one better, with a miraculously fat guitar tone and tight arrangements." The Columbus Dispatch thought that "the manic, rockabilly-tinged rocker 'Professional Againster' and the fuzz-guitar blast of 'Jukebox Lean' are reminiscent of the Stooges' '1969'."

AllMusic wrote that "the Turks' revivalism would be tiring if it wasn't for their amateurish enthusiasm and their goofy, off-the-wall sense of humor."

Track listing

References

New Bomb Turks albums
1996 albums
Epitaph Records albums